Anna Unterberger (born 23 September 1985) is an Italian actress from Bozen.

Life
While Anna was a child, her Danish mother worked in theatre with disabled people. By the time she was in high school she knew she wanted to be an actress. After finishing high school she financed her early drama and vocal training by doing odd jobs. From 2005 to 2009, she went to school at the Vienna Conservatory. Early in her career she acted at the State Theater in Copenhagen, at the Summer Festival in Kottingbrunn, and in the Drachengasse theater in Vienna. In 2008 she also appeared in film productions and in 2009 and 2010 she became an ensemble member at the Salzburger Landestheater.

She currently lives in Salzburg, Vienna, Berlin, or Munich, traveling between them as her job requires her to.

Stage roles
In 2007 she got her first acting roles at the Summer Festival in Kottingbrunn as Helena in the Pirate and the Daughter and in Friedrich Dürrenmatt's The Visit. While at the Copenhagen drama school she also acted in Aristophanes Lysistrata.

In 2009, while working at Salzburger Landestheater, she took over the roles of Recha in Gotthold Ephraim Lessing's Nathan the Wise, The Lord in Johann Wolfgang von Goethe's Faust, Peppi in Johann Nestroy's The Evil Spirit Lumpacivagabundus, and Evelyn in Neil Labute's The Measure of All Things.

Film and television
In 2008 she got her first film role during her training at the Conservatory of Vienna, where she portrayed Gretchen in Urs Odermatt's film adaptation of George Tabori's Mein Kampf.

In 2010, she portrayed Britta in the Oskar Roehler's film Jud Süss - Film ohne Gewissen.

In 2012 she was given a guest star role in the German television series The Old Fox.

In October 2012 she portrayed Minna in the film adaptation of Daniel Kehlmann's Measuring the World.

In April 2012, she was a jury member at the Bolzano Film Festival.

Awards
 2008: Award in the Fidelio talent competition in the category of interpretation

References

External links
 

1985 births
Living people
Italian actresses
Actors from Bolzano
Germanophone Italian people
Italian people of Danish descent